K-124 was a  east–west state highway in the U.S. state of Kansas. K-124's western terminus was at K-14 and, until 1966, K-129 in the city of Beloit and the eastern terminus was at U.S. Route 24 (US-24) in Beloit. It is now known as East Main Street.

Route description 
K-124 began at an intersection with K-14 and travelled west for  through the city of Beloit before ending at US-24.

K-124 was not included in the National Highway System. The National Highway System is a system of highways important to the nation's defense, economy, and mobility. K-124 did connect to the National Highway System at its eastern terminus, US-24.

History 
In a February 28, 1957 it was approved to realign US-24 to the east of Beloit. Then in an August 13, 1958 resolution, it was approved to designate a  spur from the new US-24 west to Beloit as soon as the county had finished necessary projects to bring the road up to state highway standards. Then by mid-October 1958 the county had finished necessary projects and in an October 22, 1958 resolution it became K-124. By 1968 K-124 had been extended west to end at K-14. K-124 was decommissioned in 1986 and is now known as East Main Street.

Major intersections

References

External links

Kansas Department of Transportation State Map
KDOT: Historic State Maps

124